The Savoia-Marchetti SM.81 was an Italian three-engine aircraft. Unlike its contemporary, the Savoia-Marchetti SM.79, it was fitted with a wide range of engines from its introduction.

Engines
Standardizing engines used in individual theatres of operation was necessary. Aircraft based in Italy and Spain had Alfa 125/126 engines, those based in Libya had GR 14K's and Eastern Africa based aircraft were powered by Piaggio engines. In addition, a single prototype twin-engined aircraft (designated S.M.81B) was flown using Isotta Fraschini engines

Alfa Romeo 125 RC35

  
 Total power: 1,298-1,521 kW (1,740-2,040 hp)

Gnome-Rhône 14Kc

 
 Total power: 1,455-2,237 kW (1,950-3,000 hp)

Piaggio P.X. RC15

 
Total power: 1,499-1,567 kW (2,010-2,100 hp)

Alfa Romeo 126 RC34

Total power: 1,746-2,014 kW (2,340-2,700 hp)

Piaggio P.IX RC40

 
Total power:

Isotta Fraschini Asso IX RC

626 kW 
Total power: 1,252 kW

Airscrews
Three-bladed metal propellers were used with duralumin blades and steel hubs.

Fuel Tanks
The fuel tanks, as was standard for Italian multi-engined aircraft, were metal self-sealing fuel tanks using materials developed by SEMAPE, the specialized manufacturer. Eight tanks were fitted, with six in the centre wing (4 × 150 L/40 US gallon and 2 × 1,140 L/301 US gal tanks) and two 370 L (100 US gal) tanks (or 780 L/210 US gal with Gnome-Rhône 14K engines) in the outer wings. This gave an overall fuel capacity of 3,620 or 4,400 L (960 or 1,160 US gal).

Performance
With a total of 1,305-1,752 kW (1,750-2,350 hp) the SM.81 was well served, even if individually the engines were underpowered. The extra power of many engine-sets was valuable in high and hot conditions, but their larger diameter was sometimes enough to reduce maximum speed by adding more drag. Even so, the aircraft was faster than the Junkers Ju 52, its most direct equivalent.

Even with the same or even greater fuel load than the SM.79, the SM.81 had a shorter range. It had a maximum  endurance in normal conditions. The ferry range to Spain in 1936 was an example of the relatively short range of the aircraft, perhaps caused (as was the low speed) by drag.

References

 Purnell's Illustrated Encyclopedia of Modern Weapons and Warfare (Part work 1978-1979). London : Phoebus.
Gunston, Bill. The Illustrated Encyclopedia of Combat Aircraft of World War II. London: Salamander Books, 1978. .
Passingham, Malcolm. "Savoia-Marchetti SM81". Aircraft Illustrated, May 1977, Vol 10 No 5. pp. 182–187.

1930s Italian bomber aircraft
World War II Italian bombers
SM.081 propulsion